Dubovec may refer to:

Dubovec, Croatia
Dubovec, Slovakia
Dubovec Bisaški, a settlement in Croatia
Donji Dubovec, a settlement in Križevci, Croatia
Gornji Dubovec, a settlement in Križevci, Croatia
Srednji Dubovec, a settlement in Križevci, Croatia

See also
 Dubovac (disambiguation)